Kerejanga railway station is a railway station on Cuttack–Sambalpur line under the Sambalpur railway division of the East Coast Railway zone. The railway station is situated at Badakerjang in Angul district of the Indian state of Odisha.

References

Railway stations in Angul district
Sambalpur railway division